The Rascacielos de la avenida Tres de Mayo is a skyscraper in the city of Santa Cruz on the Tenerife, Canary Islands, Spain, located on Avenida Tres de Mayo.

It was designed by Carmelo Rodríguez Borrella and was inaugurated on 3 May 1974. At 85 m high with 24 storeys it was the tallest building in the city until the construction of the Torres de Santa Cruz. Today is still a symbolic building in the city of Santa Cruz de Tenerife.

See also 
 List of tallest buildings in Canary Islands

References 

Buildings and structures completed in 1974
Buildings and structures in Santa Cruz de Tenerife
Residential skyscrapers in Spain